The White Noise Movement is a political group founded in 2015 in the Republic of Georgia focused on drug decriminalization.

References

External links

Cannabis in Georgia (country)
Cannabis law reform organizations
Drug policy organizations
Political organisations based in Georgia (country)